Pahetek (also Romanized as Pāhetek and Pāhtek; also known as Pātek, Pathek, and Zīnan) is a village in Gowharan Rural District, Gowharan District, Bashagard County, Hormozgan Province, Iran. At the 2006 census, its population was 584, in 150 families.

References 

Populated places in Bashagard County